Warren Harding Coolidge was the United States Attorney for the Eastern District of North Carolina from 1969 until 1973, during the administration of President Richard Nixon. Previously, he had been a Republican candidate for North Carolina Attorney General in 1968.

As U.S. Attorney, Coolidge oversaw the prosecution of Ben Chavis and other members of the Wilmington Ten, and was involved in the early stages of the Jeffrey MacDonald murder investigation.

In 1985, Coolidge was found guilty of embezzling funds from clients and was disbarred.

References

External links
The Political Graveyard
Star-News, Apr 19, 1972
The Dr. Jeffrey MacDonald Case Chronology

United States Attorneys for the Eastern District of North Carolina
North Carolina lawyers
North Carolina Republicans
Living people
Year of birth missing (living people)